British Railways Illustrated is a British monthly railway magazine published by Irwell Press. It is aimed at railway enthusiasts particularly interested in the period 1919 to 1968. The title is often referred to by readers and in the magazine as "BRILL".

Extras
Occasionally, British Railways Illustrated publishes supplements or special editions. These may cover a particular region, a class of locomotive or a period in time.

References

1991 establishments in the United Kingdom
Magazines established in 1991
Monthly magazines published in the United Kingdom
Rail transport magazines published in the United Kingdom
Mass media in Bedfordshire